The Model for Prediction Across Scales (MPAS) is an Earth system modeling software that integrates atmospheric, oceanographic, and cryospheric modeling across scales from regional to planetary. It includes climate and weather modeling and simulations that were used initially by researchers in 2013. The atmospheric models were created by the Earth System Laboratory at the National Center for Atmospheric Research and the oceanographic models were created by the Climate, Ocean, and Sea Ice Modeling Group at Los Alamos National Laboratory. The software has been used to model real-time weather as well as seasonal forecasting of convection, tornadoes and tropical cyclones. The atmospheric modeling component of the software can be used with other atmospheric modeling software including the Weather Research and Forecasting Model, the Global Forecast System, and the Community Earth System Model.

See also 
 Tropical cyclone forecast model
 Wind wave model
 Global circulation model

References 

Notes

External links 
 MPAS homepage
 2015 NCAR Program Operating Plan: The Model for Prediction Across Scales (MPAS)
 One Image That Shows Future of Climate Models

Physics software
Numerical climate and weather models
Physical oceanography